Sportcomplex Varkenoord is a sports facility located in Rotterdam, Netherlands. Varkenoord is the home base of Feyenoord Academy, the women's team and the amateur football club SC Feyenoord. The fields are also being used as training ground by Feyenoord's first team squad.

External links
Varkenoord at FeyenoordAcademy.com 

Feyenoord
Varkenoord